Leptomyrina boschi is a butterfly in the family Lycaenidae. It is found in the Ethiopian Highlands of central Ethiopia

References

Endemic fauna of Ethiopia
Butterflies described in 1911
Hypolycaenini
Lepidoptera of Ethiopia
Fauna of the Ethiopian Highlands